At least four ships of the French Navy have borne the name Siroco:

 was a  launched in 1901 and struck in 1925.
 was a  launched in 1925 and sunk in 1940
 was a  launched in 1939 as Le Corsaire and renamed Siroco in 1941. She was scuttled in 1942
 was a  launched in 1996. She was sold to Brazil in 2015 and renamed Bahia

French Navy ship names